Scott Mayfield (born October 14, 1992) is an American ice hockey player for the  New York Islanders of the National Hockey League (NHL).

Early life
Mayfield was born on October 14, 1992, in St. Louis, Missouri, to parents Jane and Andy. He is the middle child of three siblings between older brother Patrick and younger sister Sarah. His parents met while attending the University of Northern Colorado; his father later attended law school at the University of Denver. Due to his parents' background in Colorado, he grew up rooting for the Denver Broncos. Mayfield learned how to skate while growing up in Webster Groves, Missouri.

Playing career
Growing up in Missouri, Mayfield played three years of junior varsity ice hockey at Webster Groves High School. While competing with the 18U AAA St. Louis Amateur Blues, Mayfield won the overall skills competition of a 2009 national tournament. As such, he was invited to a United States junior team development camp, where he was named the top defenseman and invited to play in the 2009 Ivan Hlinka Memorial Tournament. Following the tournament, Mayfield began to garner attention from hockey scouts and he was drafted by the Indiana Ice of the United States Hockey League (USHL). He was later traded to the Youngstown Phantoms and subsequently became the youngest player in the league. Prior to starting his USHL career, Mayfield committed to play for the University of Denver Pioneers which compete in the Western Collegiate Hockey Association (WCHA).

Upon joining the Phantoms for his rookie season, Mayfield struggled to match the speed of the game but eventually tallied 22 points and 145 penalty minutes through 59 games. During the 2010–11 season, Mayfield was invited to participate in the NHL Research, Development and Orientation Camp and played for Team USA at the 2010 World Junior A Challenge. He tallied one assists and four penalty minutes throughout the tournament to help them win a gold medal. As a result of his defensive plays, Mayfield was named to the All-Tournament team and the MVP. In his final season with the Phantoms, Mayfield was also elected to the 2010–11 USHL Eastern Conference All-Star team.

Collegiate 
Following his final USHL season, Mayfield earned a final ranking of 24th amongst North American skaters from the NHL Central Scouting Bureau. As such, he was invited to participate in the 2011 NHL Draft Combine where he placed in the top 10 in eight events including the Vertec test and Hand Eye Coordination test. Mayfield was eventually selected in the second round, 34th overall, by the New York Islanders in the 2011 NHL Entry Draft.

Mayfield played two seasons for the Denver Pioneers, tallying 29 points through 81 games. He also helped the Pioneers make two NCAA tournament appearances and was selected for the NCAA All-Academic team in 2013. He concluded his collegiate career by signing a three-year entry-level contract with the Islanders on April 5 and subsequently joined their American Hockey League affiliate, the Bridgeport Sound Tigers, on an Amateur Tryout Contract.

Professional 
Mayfield joined the Sound Tigers to conclude their 2012–13 season. He played in six games and accumulates no points and two penalty minutes. Following this, he attended the Islanders 2013 training camp before being loaned back to the Sound Tigers. On April 6, 2014, Mayfield made his NHL debut with the Islanders in a 4–0 loss against the Columbus Blue Jackets. While wearing jersey number 42, Mayfield played 17:04 minutes of ice time and recorded two shots and four hits. The following game, Mayfield was one of 10 Islanders rookies to be part of the lineup. He remained with the Islanders until the conclusion of the season when he was one of six skaters returned to the Sound Tigers.

After making his NHL debut the previous season, Mayfield spent his second full professional campaign with the Sound Tigers. He tallied 14 points through 69 games before joining the Islanders for their postseason run. Upon joining the Islanders, Mayfield was entered into the lineup for Game 6 against the Washington Capitals. In his first postseason game of the season, Mayfield played 10:30 minutes of ice time which increased in Game 7 to 14:20. Once the Islanders were eliminated from the playoffs, Mayfield began his offseason training which included boxing and Mixed martial arts training. He specifically focused on improving his quick first step and agility.

Despite his offseason training, Mayfield was returned to the Sound Tigers to begin his third full professional campaign. By January, as injuries plagued the Islanders lineup, Mayfield earned his first NHL recall of the season. At the time of the recall, he had tallied three goals and two assists through 35 games. On April 9, 2016, Mayfield scored his first NHL goal in a 4–3 overtime loss against the Buffalo Sabres to help the Islanders qualify for the 2016 Stanley Cup playoffs.

Mayfield received his first recall of the 2016–17 season on November 14, 2016, after an injury to defenseman Dennis Seidenberg.

After appearing in a career-high 29 regular-season games with the Islanders, tallying 10 points, and leading the team in penalty minutes, Mayfield signed a five-year, $7.25-million contract extension with the team. Following the signing, Mayfield accumulated two more points before suffering a lower-body injury during a 5–4 overtime loss to the Nashville Predators on February 6. It was later announced that he was expected to miss four weeks to recover.

Personal life 
Mayfield's older brother, Patrick, is a captain in the United States Air Force, and his younger sister Sarah is an interior designer. Patrick was honored as one of the "Military Heroes of the Game" at an Islanders game in February 2020. He proposed to his fiancé Emily Bayless in 2019 while rehabbing his ankle injury, and they planned on marrying in 2020. However, due to the COVID-19 pandemic, their wedding was delayed.

Career statistics

Regular season and playoffs

International

Awards and honors

References

External links 

1992 births
Living people
American men's ice hockey defensemen
Bridgeport Sound Tigers players
Ice hockey people from St. Louis
Denver Pioneers men's ice hockey players
New York Islanders draft picks
New York Islanders players
Webster Groves High School alumni
Youngstown Phantoms players